The Stad Linité (official name) is a multi-use stadium in Victoria, Seychelles. It is currently used mostly for football matches. The stadium holds 10,000 and was built in 1992. The stadium plays host also to most of the home games of the Seychelles national football team. The stadium received in February 2007 an artificial turf pitch 3rd generation, One Star field test, by FIFA's development programme "win in Africa with Africa".

References

External links
 Cafe.daum.net/stade – Stadium Pictures
 Frank Jasperneite profile

Football venues in Seychelles
Athletics (track and field) venues in Seychelles
Seychelles
Victoria, Seychelles